Swift Presbyterian Church is a historic Presbyterian church on Swift Church Road in Miflin, Alabama.  It was built in 1905 and added to the National Register of Historic Places in 1988.

References

Presbyterian churches in Alabama
Churches on the National Register of Historic Places in Alabama
National Register of Historic Places in Baldwin County, Alabama
Gothic Revival church buildings in Alabama
Churches completed in 1905
Churches in Baldwin County, Alabama
1905 establishments in Alabama